Kurdistan uezd, also known colloquially as Red Kurdistan, was a Soviet administrative unit that existed for six years from 1923 to 1929 and included the districts of Kalbajar, Lachin, Qubadli and part of Jabrayil. It was part of Azerbaijan SSR, with the administrative center being in Lachin. It was briefly succeeded by the Kurdistan Okrug from 30 May to 23 July 1930.

History

Establishment and Dissolution 
The uezd was established on 7 July 1923. The majority of Kurds in the region were Shia, unlike the Sunni Kurds of the Nakhichevan uezd and other areas of the Middle East. At the 1926 Soviet Census, the uezd had a total population of 51,426 people, with ethnic Kurds constituting 72.3% or 37,182 people. According to the same census, 92.5% of the population of the uezd cited the Azerbaijani language as their native tongue.

On 8 April 1929, the Sixth Azerbaijani Congress of Soviets approved a reform of the administrative structure, abolishing all uezds, including the Kurdistan uezd. On 30 May 1930, Kurdistan Okrug was founded in its place. The okrug included the territory of the former uezd and also entire Zangilan District and a part of Jabrayil District. The okrug was created by the Soviet authorities in order to attract the sympathies of Kurds in neighboring Iran and Turkey and take advantage of Kurdish nationalist movements in those countries. However, due to the protests of Soviet Ministry of Foreign Affairs, which was concerned that open support of Kurdish nationalism could damage relations with Turkey and Iran, the okrug was disbanded on 23 July 1930.

After the dissolution Kurds continued to assimilate into the dominant culture of the neighbouring Azeris, some religious Yazidi tribes mostly stayed the same. Historically mixed Azeri-Kurdish marriages were commonplace; however the Kurdish language was rarely passed on to the children in such marriages.

Persecution
In the late 1930s, Soviet authorities deported most of the Kurdish population of Azerbaijan and Armenia to Kazakhstan, Turkmenistan, Kyrgyzstan, and Uzbekistan. The Kurds of Georgia also became victims of Joseph Stalin's great purge in 1944. Years later, Kurds immigrated to Kazakhstan from the neighbouring countries, Uzbekistan and Kyrgyzstan. 

Starting from 1961, when the First Iraqi–Kurdish War started, there were efforts by the deportees for the restoration of their rights - spearheaded by Mehmet Babayev; these proved to be futile.

Coup Attempts 
In 1992, after the capture of Lachin by Armenian forces during the First Nagorno-Karabakh War, the Kurdish Republic of Lachin was declared in Armenia by a group of Kurds led by Wekîl Mustafayev. However, since most of the area's Kurdish population had fled along with the ethnic Azerbaijani people and had found refuge in other regions of Azerbaijan, this attempt failed. Mustafayev later took refuge in Italy.

See also
Kurds in Azerbaijan
Kurds in Russia
List of Kurdish dynasties and countries
Kurdish alphabets
Yekbûn

References

Notes

Sources

Müller, Daniel "The Kurds and the Kurdish Language in Soviet Azerbaijan According to the All-Union Census of December 17, 1926". The Journal of Kurdish Studies, vol. 3, pp. 61–84.
Müller, Daniel. "The Kurds of Soviet Azerbaijan 1920-91". Central Asian Survey, vol. 19 i. 1 (2000), pp. 41–77.
Yilmaz, Harun. “The Rise of Red Kurdistan.” Iranian Studies, vol. 47 i. 5 (2014), pp. 799–822.

Nagorno-Karabakh
Azerbaijan Soviet Socialist Republic
Forced migration in the Soviet Union
Uezds of the Soviet Union
Former Kurdish states in Azerbaijan
Former countries of the interwar period